The Voice UK is a British television music competition to find new singing talent. The eighth series began airing on 5 January 2019 and concluded on 6 April 2019, presented by Emma Willis on ITV. will.i.am, Jennifer Hudson, Sir Tom Jones and Olly Murs returned for their eighth, third, seventh and second series, respectively. The series is the third and final series under the new three-year contract confirmed by ITV in November 2015.

On 6 April 2019, Molly Hocking was announced the winner of the season, marking the Olly Murs' first win as coach.

Coaches

On 1 November 2018, it was announced that Vick Hope (last series' backstage reporter and The V Room host) would be replaced by AJ Odudu.

On 9 March 2019, the guest mentors for the knockout round were announced to be: James Arthur to help Sir Tom Jones, Nicole Scherzinger to help will.i.am, Olly Alexander (of Years & Years) to help Jennifer Hudson and Anne-Marie to help Olly Murs.

Teams 
Colour key:

  Winner
  Runner-up
  Third place
  Fourth place 
  Eliminated in the Semi-Final
  Eliminated in the Knockouts
  Artist was stolen by another coach at the Battles
  Eliminated in the Battles

Blind auditions
It was announced by ITV that the eighth series would begin broadcasting on 5 January 2019.

Colour key

Episode 1 (5 January) 
The series premiere aired on from 8:30pm until 9:35pm.

Episode 2 (12 January)

Episode 3 (19 January)

Episode 4 (26 January)

Episode 5 (2 February)

Episode 6 (9 February)

Episode 7 (16 February)

Battle rounds

Colour key

Episode 1 (23 February)

Episode 2 (2 March)

Episode 3 (9 March)

Knockouts
A new voting system called Lifeline vote was introduced this year, which would save one contestant from the 16 eliminated acts based on the public's vote. The act who was saved by lifeline vote would be revealed at the beginning of the live Semi-final.

Episode 1 (16 March)

Episode 2 (23 March)

Live shows
The live shows began on 30 March 2019.

Results summary
 Team’s colour key 
 Team Will
 Team JHud
 Team Tom
 Team Olly 

Result's colour key
 Artist received the most public votes
 Artist received the fewest votes and was eliminated

Week 1: Semi-final (30 March)
Musical guest: Donel Mangena ("Planets")
With the eliminations of Emmanuel Smith, Moya, NXTGEN and Nicole Dennis, will.i.am and Jennifer Hudson no longer have any artists remaining on their teams.  This is the first time in all eight seasons that will.i.am does not have an artist represented in the final.  This is also the first time in the show's history that only two coaches are represented in the final. With the advancements of Bethzienna Williams and Jimmy Balito, this is the first time that a stolen artist, who is representing the finals, did not originally earn a chair turn by their coach in the blind auditions.

Week 2: Final (6 April)
Musical guest: Ruti ("Racing Cars")

Group performance: The Voice UK coaches – "Gimme Some Lovin'"

Reception

Ratings
Official ratings are 28-day figures, include viewers watching on PC and mobile devices, and are taken from BARB.

References

External links
 Official website

Series 08
2019 British television seasons